Michael Danna (born December 1, 1997) is an American football defensive end for the Kansas City Chiefs of the National Football League (NFL). He played college football at Central Michigan and Michigan.

High school career
Danna began playing football at De La Salle Collegiate High School in Warren, Michigan. In 2014, he led the school to a state title. Danna compiled 20 tackles-for-loss and earned All-State special mention from the Associated Press.

College career
Danna played three seasons at Central Michigan and earned first-team all-Mid-American Conference honors in 2018. He transferred to Michigan where he was a part-time starter. Danna had 38 tackles (three for a loss) and three sacks during the 2019 season. He had six tackles and a sack against Michigan State, earning Team Defensive Lineman of the Game honors. Danna also had five tackles and a sack against Iowa.

Professional career

Danna was selected by the Kansas City Chiefs with the 177th overall pick in the fifth round of the 2020 NFL Draft.

In Week 2 against the Los Angeles Chargers, Danna recorded his first career sack during the 23–20 win. He was placed on injured reserve on October 10, 2020, with a hamstring injury. He was activated on October 31. He was placed on the reserve/COVID-19 list by the team on January 6, 2021, and activated on January 11.

In 2022, Danna won his first Super Bowl ring when the Chiefs defeated the Philadelphia Eagles in Super Bowl LVII.

References

External links
Kansas City Chiefs bio
Michigan Wolverines football bio

1997 births
Living people
Players of American football from Detroit
American football defensive ends
Central Michigan Chippewas football players
Michigan Wolverines football players
Kansas City Chiefs players